was a professional Go player.

He is well known in the Western go world for his book Lessons in the Fundamentals of Go.

Biography 
Kageyama was born in Shizuoka Prefecture, Japan. In 1948, he won the biggest amateur Go tournament in Japan, the All-Amateur Honinbo. The year after that, he passed the pro exam. 

For two years straight, Kageyama was runner up for the Prime Minister Cup. First, against Otake Hideo, then Hoshino Toshi. His style was a very calm one with deep calculations, similar to what Ishida Yoshio would use later on. The greatest accomplishment of his life, in his own opinion, was beating Rin Kaiho in the Prime Minister Cup semi-finals. At the time, Rin was the Meijin, the top player in Japan. Kageyama gave a commentary on this game in his book "Lessons in the Fundamentals of Go", where he wrote

Promotion record

Runners-up

Awards
Takamatsu-no-miya Prize once (1967)

Bibliography 
Lessons in the Fundamentals of Go 
Kage's Secret Chronicles of Handicap Go

References

1926 births
1990 deaths
Japanese Go players
Go (game) writers